is a former Japanese football player. He played for Japan national team.

Club career
Ishii was born on July 7, 1951. After graduating from Chuo University, he joined Furukawa Electric in 1976. The club won the league champions in 1976 and 1985–86. The club also won 1976 Emperor's Cup, 1977, 1982 and 1986 JSL Cup. He retired in 1986. He played 149 games and scored 5 goals in the league. He was selected Best Eleven in 1976.

National team career
On February 12, 1974, when Ishii was a Chuo University student, he debuted for the Japan national team against Singapore. In September, he was selected by Japan for the 1974 Asian Games. He also played in the 1978 World Cup qualification. He played 15 games for Japan until 1979.

Club statistics

National team statistics

References

External links
 
 Japan National Football Team Database

1951 births
Living people
Chuo University alumni
Japanese footballers
Japan international footballers
Japan Soccer League players
JEF United Chiba players
Footballers at the 1974 Asian Games
Association football defenders
Asian Games competitors for Japan